HMS Foylebank was a converted 5,500 ton merchant ship active during the Second World War. She was launched as the MV Foylebank by Bank Line (Andrew Weir Shipping) in 1930 and requisitioned by the Royal Navy in September 1939. She was converted into an anti-aircraft ship, equipped with 0.5 inch (12.7 mm) machine guns, two quad 2-pounder pom-poms and four twin high angle 4-inch gun turrets. The Foylebank saw action in Portland Harbour next to the Isle of Portland in Dorset, England. She arrived in Portland on 9 June 1940 for a build-up to anti-aircraft duties commanded by Captain Henry P. Wilson.

Fate 
On 4 July 1940 whilst the majority of her crew were at breakfast, unidentified aircraft were reported to the south. These were originally thought to be Allied aircraft returning to base but they turned out to be 26 Junkers Ju 87 Stuka dive bombers. These aircraft had the objective of disabling the Foylebank which was seen as a threat to their plans to destroy Britain's coastal shipping. In an eight-minute attack, two aircraft were shot down by the Foylebank but an estimated 22 bombs hit the ship and the ship listed to port, shrouded in smoke. She sank on 5 July 1940. 176 out of a total crew of 298 were killed. Many more were wounded. One of the ship's company, Jack Foreman Mantle, was posthumously awarded the Victoria Cross for his actions in defending the ship from aircraft whilst mortally injured.

Salvage 
The Foylebank was later salvaged in two sections. The forward section was broken up at Falmouth, Cornwall in 1947, the aft section was broken up at Thos. W. Ward Grays in Essex in 1952. Some fragments remain on the seabed and one piece has been recovered and presented to the Portland Museum.

References

Merchant ships of the United Kingdom
World War II naval ships of the United Kingdom
World War II shipwrecks in the English Channel
Ships built in Belfast
1930 ships
Maritime incidents in July 1940
Ships sunk by German aircraft
Ships built by Harland and Wolff
Auxiliary anti-aircraft ships of the Royal Navy